Silent Invasion may refer to:

Silent Invasion (book), a 2020 non-fiction book
The Silent Invasion, a 1962 film
The Silent Invasion (comics), a black and white comics series